Hyadina is a genus of shore flies in the family Ephydridae.

Species

H. agostinhoi Frey, 1945
H. albovenosa Coquillett, 1900
H. binotata (Cresson, 1926)
H. borkumensis Stuke, 2020
H. bulbosa Clausen, 1989
H. certa Cresson, 1931
H. clauseni Mathis & Zatwarnicki, 2004
H. corona (Cresson, 1926)
H. femorata Canzoneri & Rampini, 1998
H. fenestrata Becker, 1903
H. flavipes Sturtevant & Wheeler, 1954
H. freidbergi Mathis & Zatwarnicki, 2004
H. fukuharai Miyagi, 1977
H. furva Cresson, 1926
H. giordanii Canzoneri & Meneghini, 1975
H. guttata (Fallén, 1813)
H. hivaoae (Malloch, 1933)
H. immaculata Becker, 1919
H. irrorata Tonnoir & Malloch, 1926
H. japonica Miyagi, 1977
H. jinpingensis Zhang & Yang, 2009
H. kugleri Mathis & Zatwarnicki, 2004
H. longicaudata Zhang & Yang, 2009
H. mathisi Canzoneri & Rampini, 1998
H. meggiolaroi Canzoneri & Meneghini, 1975
H. minima (Papp, 1975)
H. munarii Mathis & Zatwarnicki, 2003
H. nigricornis Frey, 1930
H. nigrifacies Miyagi, 1977
H. nigropleuralis Canzoneri & Meneghini, 1969
H. nitida (Macquart, 1835)
H. obscurifrons  Tonnoir & Malloch, 1926
H. pauciguttata Canzoneri, 1987
H. penalbovenosa Clausen, 1983
H. pollinosa Oldenberg, 1923
H. porteri Brèthes, 1919
H. pruinosa (Cresson, 1926)
H. pseudonitida Canzoneri & Meneghini, 1969
H. pulchella Miyagi, 1977
H. pullipes Cresson, 1930
H. quinquepunctata Zhang & Yang, 2009
H. rufipes (Meigen, 1830)
H. sauteri Cresson, 1934
H. scutellata (Haliday, 1839)
H. subnitida Sturtevant and Wheeler, 1954
H. ukundensis Canzoneri & Meneghini, 1987
H. vittifacies Hardy, 1965
H. vockerothi Clausen, 1984
H. xanthopus Frey, 1958

References

Ephydridae
Taxa named by Alexander Henry Haliday
Brachycera genera
Diptera of Europe
Diptera of Asia
Diptera of North America
Diptera of South America